Lay My Soul to Waste is the second release by Brooklyn metal band A Pale Horse Named Death, released by SPV America on May 21, 2013.

A music video (the very first for the band) was released for the track "DMSLT".

The album was also released on limited edition, translucent green marbled vinyl.

Reception
Blabbermouth.net wrote "Think Alice in Chains, only harder, angrier and with a more perverse view of the world, as if they were reared in a row house in Bensonhurst, as opposed to the rainy landscape of Seattle, all the while feasting on a steady diet of Black Sabbath records".

Track listing

"Lay My Soul to Waste" – 1:13
"Shallow Grave" – 5:18
"The Needle in You" – 4:16
"In the Sleeping Death" – 5:35
"Killer by Night" – 3:33
"Growing Old" – 3:32
"Dead of Winter" – 3:23
"Devil Came with a Smile" – 4:05
"Day of the Storm" – 7:39
"DMSLT" – 4:38
"Cold Dark Mourning" – 7:15

Song notes
"DMSLT" stands for "Doesn't Make Sense Living Today".

Notes

External links
Official website

2013 albums
A Pale Horse Named Death albums
SPV GmbH albums